Bane is a Christian village located in the North Governorate of Lebanon. The inhabitants are Maronite Christians.

It is situated in north of Lebanon as a very holy and spiritually dearly held location – The Valley of Qadisha also known as The Valley Of The Saints.

There are approximately 35,000 Bane Christian descendants living in Australia.
This is not counting America, Mexico, Brazil etc.
These descendants have prospered in the areas of construction, property development and many other businesses. Bane people have contributed immensely to both Australian and Lebanese causes, charities and heritage.
Bane is situated at an altitude of 1,470 metres and is 132 km from Beirut; 46 km from Tripoli and 8 km from the Cedar.
Bane, is located on the road going from Ehden to Bsharri in the northern part of the Qadisha valley, Bane is mentioned in documents as old as 1265 AD.

Families of Bann 

Originally, there were only a handful of families that originated from Bane however over time, many families have branched out from several of the larger families which now form over 40 last names or migrated from other villages many years ago. Below is a complete list of all families from Bane today:
Abraham, Antoun, Aouchan, Aoutel, Abdo, Abdow, Bainy, Baynie, Beaini, Beshara, Chiha (Sheehi in North America), Daabul, Daboul, Daoud, Elhage, Estephan, Fachkha, Fahim, Gabriel, Habkouk, Hassarati, Kaoutal, Khamis, Khedair, Khodeir, Khoudair, Khouri, Khoury, Lahoud, Mait, Meait, Moiet, Maait, Moit, Mahboub, Massoud, Merhi, Mikhael, Moussa, Nadwie, Saliba, Semaan, Srour, Sukar, Solomon, Tadros, Zaiter, Zeaiter, Zeidan

The Clergy of Bann 

 Fr. Daniel from Bane

The priest Daniel from the Village of Bane had written a manuscript in the time of Patriarch Dawud (David) surnamed Yuhanna (John) residing at the Mar Sarkis monastery in the land of Hardin c. 1397 AD.

 Fr. Youhanna Ben Namroun El-Banny

The monk Youhanna Ben Namroun El-Banny was the Superior of Saint Antonious Qozhaya Monastery in the year 1529. He was re-elected superior of the Monastery in 1556.

 Fr. Youhanna Matta El-Banny

Brother of Murhej Nairoon El-Banny. He entered the Maronite college in 1642, and was ordained a priest in 1663 in Ravenna, Italy.

 Fr. Murhej Nairoon El-Banny

His father was from Bane, but Murhej was born in Rome around 1625. His Lebanese name "Murhe" was translated into Latin as "Faustus". He entered the Maronite College in Rome in 1636 and completed his studies in 1649 and returned to Lebanon. In 1650, he was ordained priest at Mar Abda Heraraya by Patriarch Yuhanna Safrawy. He was sent in the same year to Rome by the Patriarch to oversee the printing of the Phenqitho, the Maronite "proper of the Saints" in Syriac. In Rome, in order to obtain the permission to print this book Faustus was requested, to translate it into Latin and submit the translation to a Roman committee for examination. Abraham Echellensis, maternal uncle of Faustus (Murhej), was one of the five members of this committee. This book was printed in Rome in 1666 by the congregation of Propaganda Fide.

He remained in Rome as was appointed professor of Syriac at the Sapienza, interpreter at Congregation of Propaganda Fide, and pastor of the church of St. Eustache. He died in Rome in 1711. His literary works were:

 The translation from Syriac into Latin and publication of the Syriac text of the Phenqith in 1652-1666.
 A treatise on the origin of the Maronites, published in Rome in 1679.
 Explanation of the Catholic faith in the light of Oriental Syriac documents, Rome 1694.
 The publication in Arabic and Syriac of the New testament, for the use of the Maronite liturgy Rome, 1703.

 Bishop Youhanna Habkouk

Bishop Youhanna Habkouk bequeathed the Monastery of Saint Anthony of Qozhaya to Father Abdallah Qaraaly, Superior General of the Lebanese Maronite Order on 5 July 1708.

 Fr. Antonios Zeaiter

At the age of 18 he joined the Lebanese Maronite order on 22 September 1895 at Saint Mousa Monastery and was ordained a priest on 28 July 1904. He died in Saint Antonios Qazhaya Monastery on 31 December 1943 at the age of 66.

 Fr. Yousef Mahfoud (Descendant of the Habkouk Family)

Baptismal name is Gabriel Mahfoud. At the age of 20 he entered the Lebanese Maronite Order on 15 August 1901 at Kafefine monastery and was ordained a priest on 10 January 1910. He died in Saint Antonios Qazhaya Monastery on 3 March 1966 at the age of 85.

 Fr. Bernardous Habkouk

Born 1905 Said Masoud Habkouk in Providence, Rhode Island, US, he is the son of Masoud Habkouk and Fouz Elias (Merhi) Al-Koury. He returned to his village Bane with his parents in 1917. At the age of 17 he joined the Lebanese Maronite Order on 19 March 1922 at Kafefine monastery and was ordained a priest on 1 May 1931 at the Monastery of our Lady Al-Moohanet, Byblos. He Served the Lebanese Maronite order for 58 years, filled with challenges and service to his church and the order, great Speaker and teacher of Christian studies. In 1962 he was appointed a director of the Novice. He served his village Bane as well as Mar Semaan Al Qarn, Aytto. Father Bernardous declined high position in his order, but worked energetically for the good of his order and the community. He died in Saint Antonious Qazhaya Monastery on 8 March 1978 at the age of 76.

 Fr. Abraham Khoudair

Baptismal name is Armia Khoudair. At the age of 17 he joined the Lebanese Maronite order on 19 March 1922 at Kafefine monastery and was ordained a priest on 1 May 1931. He died in Saint Antonious Qazhaya Monastery in 1983.

 Fr. Gerges Kaser (Descendant of the Habkouk Family)

Born in Bane, baptismal name is Abbas. He is the eldest son of Rashid Kaser Michael and Norma Tadross.

 Fr. Anthony Khoudair 
Born in Australia, baptismal name is Anthony. He is the eldest son of Fred and Emily Khoudair.

Church 

A common church for the Australian citizen families of Bane is the St George Maronite Catholic Church in Thornleigh, NSW, Australia.

References

External links
 Bane, Localiban 

Maronite Christian communities in Lebanon
Populated places in the North Governorate
Bsharri District